Pelucha is a genus of Mexican shrubs in the sneezeweed tribe within the daisy family.

Species
The only known species is Pelucha trifida, native to the Mexican States of Sonora and Baja California.

References

Helenieae
Monotypic Asteraceae genera
Endemic flora of Mexico